FL3 is a synthetic flavagline that displays potent anticancer and cardioprotectant activities. This compound induces the death of cancer cells by an original mechanism that involves the apoptosis-inducing factor and caspase 12, suggesting that it may improve the efficacy of cancer chemotherapies. It was also shown that FL3 may enhance the efficacy of one of the most widely used anticancer agents, doxorubicin, and alleviate its main adverse effect, cardiac damage.

References 

Diols
Benzofuran ethers at the benzene ring
Organobromides